Gabungan Sepakbola Lima Puluh Kota or Gasliko is an Indonesian football club based in Lima Puluh Kota, West Sumatra. They currently compete in the Liga 3.

Honours
 Liga 3 West Sumatra
 Runner-up: 2021

References

External links

Football clubs in Indonesia
Football clubs in West Sumatra
Association football clubs established in 1951
1951 establishments in Indonesia